Ancient Egyptians is a four-part dramatic miniseries exploring life in the land of the pharaohs of Egypt at the time of the great dynasties. The series was broadcast on Channel 4 and cost £6 million. Their stories, which span 1,500 years, unfold against the backdrop of great events in the kingdom's history and paint intimate and dramatic portraits of a rich and complex society. In recreating these ancient stories, the characters' real words and thoughts are used wherever possible, in the ancient Egyptian language. Costume and design are based on meticulous research into the wealth of real material that has survived from ancient Egypt at different periods.

References

2003 British television series debuts
2004 British television series endings
2000s British documentary television series
British military television series
Channel 4 documentary series
Television series by Warner Bros. Television Studios
English-language television shows